Manuel Eduardo López Rolón a.k.a. Eddie López (1940–1971) was a Puerto Rican journalist.

Early life and career

Eddie López was born in Fajardo, Puerto Rico in 1940, the son of Manuel López Canals (former employee of the Department of Agriculture/Forest Service) and Teresa Rolón Perez (home maker). Brother to María Esperanza Teresa López Rolón, who was then born in 1953.  He lived in Fajardo, Mayagüez, Toa Alta, Bayamón and Guaynabo where he finally settled with his wife and two boys until his death. He attended Santa Rosa High School in Bayamón, and did two years at Notre Dame University in Indiana.

His first job after leaving college was at El Mundo newspaper in 1959, where he worked for two years prior to joining The San Juan Star in July 1961. He worked as a reporter until 1963 when he was named assistant city editor.

In 1966 he advanced to city editor until one year later, when by his own choice he became a special writer and full-time columnist.

Career in media

López was the kind of rare writer who was equally successful as both a comedy and news writer. He was a script writer for Tommy Muñiz productions as well as a frequent guest on Muñiz's Esto no tiene nombre, a Puerto Rican comedy television program almost directly based on the American television program, Rowan and Martin's Laugh-In. López's first script was inspired by Orson Welles 'radio broadcast adaptation of H.G. Wells' The War of the Worlds, and described the fictional uprising of Puerto Rico's outlying islands, Culebra, Monito and Mona (whose names in Spanish are also animal names), under the leadership of a mock veterinarian, played by López himself.  The script was reportedly so well written that the station's general manager, Norman Louveau, was awakened later that night by law enforcement officials who had received many telephone calls from concerned citizens asking whether the uprising was real.  Tommy Muñiz was forced to clear things up the following morning on another television program of his.

López was also a panelist of the political debate TV show Ante la prensa, as well as the moderator for Cara a cara ante el pais, whose format is still mimicked by political debate shows in Puerto Rico, almost four decades after the show's first airing.

Fluent in English and Spanish, extraordinarily well and diversely read, he frequently did translation work.

As a newspaper columnist, he was perhaps better known for his "Candid Flowers" (a plausible literal translation of his main character's name "Candido Flores").  These were a series of Spanish stories that relied heavily on local slang, that he then would translate literally and word for word into English.  The end result would be a hilarious short story that would only be decipherable by someone who was fluent in both languages.

Eddie's love for the arts and his vast knowledge of classical music made him a well known critic of the genre.

After finding out he was severely sick with cancer, and having started radiotherapy, he had an idea for a political parody, in which he could lampoon current political wrongdoings and blame it all on his gamma ray treatments. López recruited the equally talented Jacobo Morales, who had the idea of taking Eddie's newspaper parodies and blending them with previously censored TV scripts to produce a political parody stage show.  Morales shared comedy duties with Horacio Olivo on Esto no tiene nombre, and was a reciting poet on Producciones Tommy Muñiz jibaro music television program, Borinquen Canta, where Silverio Pérez was host and because of this, he assembled them; Morales, Olivo and Pérez, for what they expected would be a one-time only show.
 
Bob MacCoy, then entertainment editor for the Star suggested the title.
The result was, "El efecto de los rayos gamma sobre Eddie Lopez" (“The effect of gamma rays on Eddie Lopez”, now known as Los Rayos Gamma or “Los Gamma” for short), the name being a take-on on the then-current play The Effect of Gamma Rays on Man-in-the-Moon Marigolds.

The string of sold-out shows in late 1968 turned into a sensation. Using his charismatic sense of humor, Eddie López managed to get sworn political enemies into one room and have them all laugh at themselves. The strategy worked, and some claim the show helped ease political tension in Puerto Rico.

Death

Eddie died on November 26, 1971, in San Juan, Puerto Rico at the rather young age of 31. His last shows were done from a wheelchair -with an oxygen tank by his side,- and his very last show occurred three days before his death. He managed to make people laugh until the end, and only felt sorry that he could not do more.

In 1972, The Best of Eddie Lopez, a collection of his columns selected by Lopez himself,  was published by Ediciones Puerto, Inc. with a prologue by Juan M. Garcia-Passalacqua.  This collection is a great sampler of the wit and humor of this very funny man.  A master of spoofs and plays on words of current events.  A few of the articles especially the one entitled "Political Verbiage" is timely today.

Shortly after his death, the Overseas Press Club of Puerto Rico announced that it would establish a yearly award to "most distinguished contribution to journalism" known as the Eddie López Special Award.

After his death, Los Rayos Gamma would go on as scheduled per his request. "The show must go on" he insisted. Friend and fellow comedic actor, Efraín López Neris (already added to the roster) would take Eddie's place, while an empty chair would be left on stage in his honor.  Eventually, "Los Gamma" became a popular TV show, and ultimately would make its way back to the stage just around each election year, this time with the help of well known comic Sunshine Logroño filling Eddie's shoes.

Eddie was buried at the Santa María Magdalena de Pazzis Cemetery in the San Juan, Puerto Rico, alongside Puerto Rican heroes like José de Diego, and Pedro Albizu Campos. His funeral was attended by governors, senators, colleagues, and  members of the media.

His satirical journalism style is still taught at the University of Puerto Rico, and his "Rayos Gamma" was left in very good hands.

Notes and references 

1940 births
1971 deaths
Burials at Santa María Magdalena de Pazzis Cemetery
People from Fajardo, Puerto Rico
Puerto Rican journalists
University of Notre Dame alumni
University of Puerto Rico faculty
20th-century journalists